Velius Longus (fl. 2nd century AD), Latin grammarian during the reign of Trajan (or Hadrian), author of an extant treatise on orthography (Heinrich Keil, Grammatici Latini, vii). He is mentioned by Macrobius (Saturnalia, iii.6.6) and Servius (Comm. on Aen. x.245) as a commentator on Virgil.

References

External links
Corpus Grammaticorum Latinorum: complete texts and full bibliography

Grammarians of Latin
1st-century Romans
2nd-century Romans